Francesco Mori (born March 28, 1975) is an Italian painter.

Biography
Mori was born in Grosseto, Italy. Now an emerging painter and graphic artist, art historian and scholar of medieval art, Francesco Mori began his artistic career self-taught at an early age. During his university years he attended the workshops of Samuel Vanni and Roberto Altmann, both heirs of the master Pietro Annigoni (1910-1988), perfecting his drawing and painting techniques.

In collaboration with Roberto Altmann, Mori teaches art history, fresco, drawing and oil painting. He also exercises the art of calligraphy and illumination and participates in the courses of the Associazione Calligrafica Italiana (ACI), attending Italian and European master calligraphers such as Anna Ronchi, Klaus Peter Schaffel and Ivano Ziggiotti.

Works
His artistic debut, crowning the theoretical and practical research of previous years, took place in 2006, when he was commissioned to paint a reproduction of the famous window by Duccio for the "fenestra rotunda magna", dating from 1288, in Siena Cathedral. Mori's copy has now replaced the original, which is preserved in the Museo dell'Opera del Duomo. In July 2007, Vittorio Sgarbi commissioned the design and execution of the windows for the rebuilt Noto Cathedral, which deals with the theme of the Word of God and the Seven Sacraments. On this occasion, Sgarbi said of him: "A simple and sensitive artist who offered an almost iconic representation in the spirit of a reborn Duilio Cambellotti." He has also made many significant contributions to Grosseto Cathedral.

Exhibitions
 2009: "Race Against Time", an exhibition of paintings and graphics, gallery events, Grosseto
 2010: "The Return", an exhibition of paintings, gallery events, Grosseto
 2011: participation in the exhibition "The Shadow of the divine in contemporary art: Artists from Noto and elsewhere", Venice Biennale, Italy Pavilion

References

External links

20th-century Italian painters
Italian male painters
21st-century Italian painters
1975 births
Living people
20th-century Italian male artists
21st-century Italian male artists